Henry Sosa Esther (July 28, 1985) is a Dominican professional baseball pitcher for the Diablos Rojos del México of the Mexican League. He was born in El Seibo, Dominican Republic. He previously played in Major League Baseball (MLB) for the Houston Astros, in the KBO League (KBO) for the Kia Tigers, Nexen Heroes, LG Twins, and SK Wyverns, and in the Chinese Professional Baseball League (CPBL) for the Fubon Guardians and Rakuten Monkeys.

Career

San Francisco Giants
Sosa was signed as an amateur free agent by the San Francisco Giants on April 23, 2004. He began his professional career in 2006 with the AZL Giants. With them, he went 2-1 with a 3.90 ERA in nine games (six starts). He also struck out 41 batters in 32 innings. In 2007, he played for the San Jose Giants and Augusta Greenjackets. He went 6-0 with a 0.73 ERA in 13 games (10 starts) with the Greenjackets and 5-5 with a 4.38 ERA in 14 starts with the Giants. He went a combined 11-5 with a 2.58 ERA in 27 games (24 starts). In 125 innings, he struck out 139 batters. He also played for the Estrellas de Oriente of the Dominican Winter League that year. For the San Jose Giants and Augusta Greenjackets in 2008, he went a combined 3-4 with a 4.21 ERA in 57 innings. He played only two games with Augusta.

Houston Astros
On July 19, 2011 Sosa was traded to the Houston Astros along with Jason Stoffel for infielder Jeff Keppinger. He made his Major League debut on August 10, 2011 against the Arizona Diamondbacks. He started the game and allowed four runs in six innings to pick up the loss. His first win was recorded when he allowed one run in six innings against the San Francisco Giants on August 25. In 10 starts he was 3-5 with a 5.23 ERA.

Kia Tigers
He pitched with the Kia Tigers in the KBO League in 2012–2013.

Los Angeles Dodgers
Sosa signed a minor league contract with the Los Angeles Dodgers in December, 2013 and was assigned to the AAA Albuquerque Isotopes. In seven starts for the Isotopes he was 1-2 with a 3.72 ERA.

Nexen Heroes
On May 15, 2014, he signed with the Nexen Heroes of the KBO.

LG Twins
Sosa signed with the LG Twins of the KBO League for the 2015 season. He re-signed with LG Twins for the 2016, 2017 and 2018 seasons. Since then, he has become one of the most well-known veteran foreign pitchers in the KBO League alongside Dustin Nippert. He became a free agent following the 2018 season.

Fubon Guardians
Sosa signed with the Fubon Guardians of the Chinese Professional Baseball League for the 2019 season.

SK Wyverns
On June 3, 2019, Sosa signed with the SK Wyverns of the KBO League for the remainder of the 2019 season. He became a free agent after the season.

Fubon Guardians (second stint)
On December 13, 2019, Sosa signed with the Fubon Guardians for the 2020 season. In 12 games with Fubon, Sosa recorded an 8-2 record and 1.56 ERA with 85 strikeouts in 86.2 innings of work. Sosa was the Opening Day starting pitcher for the Guardians on March 14, 2021 against the CTBC Brothers. In a March 21 game against the Rakuten Monkeys, Sosa collapsed to the ground after an apparent knee injury following the delivery of a pitch. On April 19, Sosa underwent ACL surgery. On July 12, Sosa was released by Fubon.

Rakuten Monkeys
On January 8, 2022, Sosa signed with the Rakuten Monkeys of the Chinese Professional Baseball League for the 2022 season. On July 7, 2022, Sosa was released in order to pursue opportunities in the Mexican League.

Diablos Rojos del México
On July 13, 2022, Sosa signed with the Diablos Rojos del México of the Mexican League.

References

External links 

player stats in Korean League
Career statistics and player information from Korea Baseball Organization

1985 births
Living people
Albuquerque Isotopes players
Arizona League Giants players
Augusta GreenJackets players
Bravos de Margarita players
Connecticut Defenders players
Corpus Christi Hooks players
Dominican Republic expatriate baseball players in South Korea
Dominican Republic expatriate baseball players in Taiwan
Dominican Republic expatriate baseball players in the United States
Fresno Grizzlies players
Fubon Guardians players
Houston Astros players
KBO League pitchers
Kia Tigers players
LG Twins players
Major League Baseball pitchers
Major League Baseball players from the Dominican Republic
Kiwoom Heroes players
Oklahoma City RedHawks players
Rakuten Monkeys players
Richmond Flying Squirrels players
San Jose Giants players
SSG Landers players
Dominican Republic expatriate baseball players in Venezuela
Estrellas Orientales players